Thai Charoen is a district of Yasothon province in northeastern Thailand.

History
Thai Charoen, formerly a sub-district (tambon) of Loeng Nok Tha, was established as a minor district (king amphoe) on 1 April 1992, consisting of five sub-districts formerly of Loeng Nok Tha.

On 11 October 1997, Thai Charoen was raised to district (amphoe) status, becoming Yasothon's ninth and Thailand's 784th district.

The area has been home to the Roman Catholic St Michael's Church, Songyae, since 1908.

Geography
Neighboring districts are (from the south clockwise): Pa Tio, Kut Chum, and Loeng Nok Tha, of Yasothon Province; Senangkhanikhom and Mueang Amnat Charoen of Amnat Charoen province.

Administration
The district is divided into five sub-districts (tambons), and 48 villages (mubans).

Education
The secondary schools in Thai Charoen are:
Kham Toei Witthaya School (โรงเรียนคำเตยวิทยา)
Nam Kham Witthaya School (โรงเรียนน้ำคำวิทยา)
Songyae Wittaya (โรงเรียนซ่งแย้วิทยา)

References

External links
 ThaiCharoen.net (in Thai).
 amphoe.com

Districts of Yasothon province